is the northern terminal station of the Hankyu Kyoto Main Line of Hankyu in Kyoto City, Japan.

Layout
The station has an island platform serving three tracks underground.

Adjacent stations

History
This station opened as Kawaramachi Station on June 17, 1963; it was renamed to Kyoto-kawaramachi Station on October 1, 2019.

Before the opening of Kawaramachi Station and Karasuma Station, the Hankyu Kyoto Main Line terminated at Ōmiya Station.

Station numbering was introduced to all Hankyu stations on 21 December 2013 with this station being designated as station number HK-86.

Passenger statistics
In fiscal 2015 (April 2015 to March 2016), approximately 27,320,000 passengers used this station annually. For historical data, see the table below.

Surrounding area
The area around the station (Shijō Kawaramachi) is one of the commercial centers of Kyoto. The real estate around the station is the most valuable in Kyoto. The Kawaramachi and Shijo streets cross over the underground station. Gion-Shijo Station on the Keihan Main Line is located beyond the Kamo River.

The station is attached underground to department stores such as Takashimaya, which has a food market on its basement floor. The station also connects underground to Karasuma Station.

References

External links

 Hankyu website: Guide and features of Kyoto-kawaramachi Station.

Hankyu Kyoto Main Line
Railway stations in Kyoto
Railway stations in Japan opened in 1963